Klaus Dietrich (born 27 June 1974) is an Austrian footballer.

He played one game for Hibernian in the 1998–99 season, a 2–0 defeat against St Mirren on 12 September 1998.

References

1974 births
Living people
Austrian footballers
Association football defenders
FK Austria Wien players
FC Red Bull Salzburg players
Grazer AK players
Hibernian F.C. players
FC Kärnten players
Dynamo Dresden players
1. FC Magdeburg players
Dresdner SC players
LASK players
First Vienna FC players
SV Stockerau players
Austrian Football Bundesliga players
Scottish Football League players